Ryder McKinley Jones (born June 7, 1994) is an American professional baseball third baseman in the Atlanta Braves organization. He has played in Major League Baseball (MLB) for the San Francisco Giants.

Career

San Francisco Giants
Jones attended Watauga High School in Boone, North Carolina and was drafted by the San Francisco Giants in the second round of the 2013 Major League Baseball Draft.

He made his professional debut with the Arizona League Giants. Jones played 2014 with the Salem-Keizer Volcanoes and Augusta GreenJackets, 2015 with the San Jose Giants and 2016 with the Richmond Flying Squirrels. After the 2016 season, he played in the Arizona Fall League. Jones started the 2017 season with the Sacramento River Cats.

On June 24, 2017, the Giants promoted Jones to the major leagues. He made his debut later that night, starting at third base against the New York Mets. On June 30, 2017, Jones recorded his first career hit against the Pittsburgh Pirates. Jones played in 53 games for the Giants in 2017 with 40 starts (27 at first base and 13 at third base). 

On July 21, 2019, Jones was designated for assignment. After not being claimed by another team, the Giants assigned Jones to their Double-A affiliate the Richmond Flying Squirrels. He became a free agent following the 2019 season.

Boston Red Sox
On February 4, 2020, Jones signed a minor league deal with the Boston Red Sox. He became a minor-league free agent on November 2, 2020.

Sugar Land Skeeters
In August 2020, Jones signed on to play for the Sugar Land Skeeters of the Constellation Energy League (a makeshift four-team independent league created as a result of the COVID-19 pandemic) for the 2020 season. He was subsequently named to the league's all-star team.

Arizona Diamondbacks
On February 6, 2021, Jones signed a minor league contract with the Arizona Diamondbacks organization. In 2021, Jones appeared in 75 games split between the Rookie-Ball Arizona Complex League Diamondbacks, Double-A Amarillo Sod Poodles, and Triple-A Reno Aces. He hit .288 with 11 home runs and 47 RBI's. Jones became a free agent following the season.

Chicago White Sox
On January 14, 2022, Jones signed a minor league contract with the Chicago White Sox. He was released on August 3, 2022.

Atlanta Braves
On January 7, 2023, Jones signed a minor league deal with the Atlanta Braves while also announcing that he would be converting to a pitcher.

References

External links

1994 births
Living people
Baseball players from Seattle
Major League Baseball third basemen
San Francisco Giants players
Arizona League Giants players
Salem-Keizer Volcanoes players
Augusta GreenJackets players
San Jose Giants players
Richmond Flying Squirrels players
Estrellas Orientales players
American expatriate baseball players in the Dominican Republic
Scottsdale Scorpions players
Sacramento River Cats players
Sugar Land Skeeters players
Amarillo Sod Poodles players
Reno Aces players